George Smyth (November 1, 1864 – 1938) was an Ontario farmer and political figure. He was elected in the 1926 provincial election representing Dundas in the Legislative Assembly of Ontario as a Liberal-Prohibitionist member and sat until 1929. The 1926 election was largely fought on the Conservative government's proposal to repeal the Ontario Temperance Act.

He was born in Matilda Township, Canada West, the son of Oliver Smyth. He was educated in Morrisburg. In 1900, he married Mary Dickey, the daughter of a former county warden. Smyth served as reeve for Matilda from 1922 to 1924 and was warden for the United Counties of Stormont, Dundas and Glengarry in 1924.

External links 

Stormont, Dundas and Glengarry : a history, 1784-1945, JG Harkness (1946)

1864 births
1938 deaths
Ontario Liberal Party MPPs